Orangeville is a small town in the Macarthur Region of New South Wales, Australia, in the Wollondilly Shire.

Heritage listings
Orangeville has a number of heritage-listed sites, including:
 Brownlow Hill Loop Road, Brownlow Hill: Brownlow Hill Estate

References

Wollondilly Shire
Towns in the Macarthur (New South Wales)